analyse & kritik (ak) (full German title: "analyse & kritik - Zeitung für linke Debatten", in English, analysis & critics - Newspaper for left debates) is a monthly newspaper in Germany. Published in Hamburg it is one of the best known left magazines in Germany. It is published by the Verein für politische Bildung, Analyse und Kritik e.V., with a circulation of 5400 as of December 2019.

The newspaper was founded in 1971 by the initially Maoist orientated Communist League (German: Kommunistischer Bund, KB) in West Germany. The KB emerged from the protests of 1968. In the 1980s KB was the leading organisation of the "undogmatic left" (undogmatische Linke). In 1999 the Verein für politische Bildung, Analyse und Kritik e.V. became publisher and the newspaper focus since then has been left, but in a broader sense.

References

1971 establishments in Germany
German-language newspapers
Newspapers published in Hamburg
Newspapers established in 1971
German news websites
Marxism